Aurai is a constituency of the Uttar Pradesh Legislative Assembly covering the city of Aurai in the Bhadohi district of Uttar Pradesh, India.

Aurai is one of five assembly constituencies in the Bhadohi Lok Sabha constituency. Since 2008, this assembly constituency is numbered 394 amongst 403 constituencies.

Election results

2022

2017
Bharatiya Janta Party candidate Dinanath Bhaskar won in 2017 Uttar Pradesh Legislative Elections defeating Samajwadi Party candidate Madhubala by a margin of 19,979 votes.

References

External links
 

Assembly constituencies of Uttar Pradesh
Bhadohi district